The Liangshan vole (Proedromys liangshanensis) is a species of rodent in the family Cricetidae. It is found only in mountainous parts of central China.

References

Proedromys
Mammals described in 2007
Rodents of China
Endemic fauna of China